Charles Calvert (1785–1852) was an English landscape-painter.

Life
Calvert was born at Glossop Hall in Derbyshire, on 23 September 1785, the eldest son of another Charles Calvert, agent of the Duke of Norfolk's estate and an amateur painter (see below). He was apprenticed to the cotton trade, and began business as a cotton merchant in Manchester, but abandoned commerce for art and became a landscape painter.

He was one of those instrumental in the foundation of the Manchester Royal Institution (now the Manchester City Art Gallery), and he was awarded the Heywood gold medal for a landscape in oil, and the Heywood silver medal for a landscape in watercolour. Much of his time was necessarily devoted to teaching, but all the moments that could be spared from it were passed in the Lake District. Even in his later years, when confined to his bed by failing health, he occupied himself in recording his reminiscences of natural beauty.

He died at Bowness-on-Windermere, Westmoreland, on 26 February 1852, and was buried there.

Family
Calvert's father, Charles Calvert the elder, was an amateur. He was born in 1754 ; died on 13 June 1797, and is buried in St. Mary's churchyard, Manchester. He lived in Oldham Street, Manchester during the winter and at Glossop Hall in the summer. Charles the elder's younger brother, Raisley Calvert, who died in 1794, was a sculptor, and is well known as the friend and admirer of William Wordsworth, to whom he bequeathed £900. Raisley had been to Cambridge University with Wordsworth,  and the poet looked after Raisley on his deathbed as he died of consumption. Other sons of Charles Calvert the elder were Frederick Baltimore Calvert, Henry Calvert and Michael Pease Calvert who were all painters. Michael was the youngest of nine children and was born on 15 March 1798 in Derbyshire, nine months after his father's death.

“Calvert! It must not be unheard by them
Who may respect my name, that I to thee
Owed many years of early liberty.
This care was thine when sickness did condemn
Thy youth to hopeless wasting, root and stem." - William Wordsworth

References

External sources

People from Glossop
1852 deaths
1785 births
19th-century English painters
English male painters
English watercolourists
19th-century English male artists